Jaime Jackson (born 1947) is a former farrier, horse hoof care lecturer, author, and researcher of the wild, free roaming horses in the U.S. Great Basin. He is best known for the practice of natural hoof care first written about in The Natural Horse: Lessons from the Wild (1992). His later work "Paddock Paradise: A Guide to Natural Horse Boarding" became a foundation for the alternative boarding system also known as Track System. Jackson's work focuses around Four Pillars of Natural Horse Care.

Career 

The Natural Horse was based upon Jackson's studies from 1982 until 1986 of the Mustang in its natural environment in the Great Basin of the western United States. Jackson discovered that not only did wild horses live longer than domestic horses, but they also suffered none of the hoof maladies that plague those kept in 'captivity', notably navicular syndrome and laminitis.  Following his research, he began experimenting on the hooves of domestic horses to find an effective way to trim their feet and allow them to remain barefoot and strong. In 1990 he stopped all shoeing of horses and instead began to advocate for the wild-horse trim. He believed that even horses with severe hoof conditions deemed incurable by veterinarians and farriers could, over time, be restored to good health through barefoot trimming and natural horse care (i.e., naturalization of the diet and boarding situation).

In the early 2000s, Jackson created the American Association of Natural Hoof Care Practitioners (AANHCP), a non-profit organization devoted to education, training and certification of the natural hoof care practitioner. Since then, the organization has expanded its scope and has changed its name to the Association for the Advancement of Natural Horse Care Practices.  Jackson is its executive director.

In 2009 Jamie Jackson established another organisation called Institute for the Study of Natural Horse Care Practices known as ISNHCP. The organisation aims to provide education on genuine Natural Hoof Care based on the Wild Horse Model. 

The guiding principles to Natural Hoof Care, according to Jackson, are: 
 Leave that which should be there naturally.
 Take only that which should be worn away naturally in the wild.
 Allow to grow that which should be there naturally but is not due to unnatural forces.
 Ignore all pathology.

Within a few years, a large, worldwide barefoot movement formed to promote the healthy benefits of barefootedness and natural horse care. According to veterinarian Robert Cook, Professor of Surgery Emeritus at Cummings School of Veterinary Medicine at Tufts University in Massachusetts, Jackson provided "indisputable evidence, available for more than a decade, disproving the claim that domesticated horses need shoes."

Jackson's book, Paddock Paradise: A Guide to Natural Boarding (2006), further advances the concept of using natural horse care to  restore and maintain optimal health. 

Jackson has moved away from client work, his efforts are now directed into further written work, consultations, and the training programme known more by its acronym ISNHCP.

Paddock Paradise and natural boarding
This natural horse boarding concept was introduced by Jackson in his book, Paddock Paradise, A Guide to Natural Horse Boarding (Star Ridge Publishing).  The premise of this boarding model is to provide safe, humane living conditions that use the horse's natural instincts, and thus to stimulate and facilitate movement and other behaviors that are essential to a biodynamically sound horse.

Jackson concluded from his studies based on the behavior of wild horses, that domesticated horses appear thrive physically, mentally and emotionally if kept in an environment that takes into consideration the most basic elements of their natural world by situating and propelling them into forward movement. According to Jackson, who founded the American Association of Natural Hoof Care Practitioners (AANHCP) in 2002, the hoof is adaptively cross-linked to the nexus of natural behavior and movement and can be restored to its native integrity and soundness by putting horses in such a simulated natural environment.  

The paddock paradise model is unlike a traditional situation with stalls, small paddocks and/or lush green pastures (which Jackson calls "founder traps"). It is designed to encourage movement through the creation of a series of fenced paths with a quantity of various stimuli such as strategically placed feeding spots and watering holes that are incorporated within or alongside the track in order to activate curiosity or movement. Natural horse care practices include elements of natural hoof care, encouraging herd mentality, foraging for small amounts of food strategically available throughout the day, maintaining a watering hole near or at the source of drinking water, and behaviors related to horses as prey animals, relative dominance (pecking order), grooming, resting and sleeping behaviors.

See also
 Natural hoof care

References 

Cook, Robert. "Is It Time for Hoof-Care Revolution?", Veterinary Times v.38, pp. 24–27, 2008.
Equine Wellness 3(5), September/October 2008, pp. 26–30.
Hansen, R.M. "Diets of Wild Horses, Cattle and Mule Deer in the Piceance Basin, Colorado", JRM, 29(5), Colorado State University, 1976.
Jackson, Jaime. "Hoof Anatomy 101", Equine Wellness Magazine, March/April 2010.
Jackson, Jaime. Paddock Paradise, Star Ridge Publishing, 2006.
Jackson, Jaime. The Natural Horse: Foundations for Natural Horsemanship, Northland Publishing, 1992; rev. Star Ridge Publishing, 1998.
Jackson, Jaime. "Understanding Wear Patterns", Equine Wellness Magazine, May/June 2010.
Jurga, Fran. "The Natural Hoof: A Sign of the Times," The Horse, 10 October 2001.
Lambert, Annie. "Lose the Shoes? Is Barefoot for Everyone?", Barrel Racer News, April 2010.
Matthias, Gerss, and Appelt, S. "Our Computer Controlled Active Stable System", The Horse's Hoof, No. 32, Fall 2008, p. 1.
Taylor, Walt. American Farriers Journal, v.26, #6, November 2000, p. 5.

Bibliography
Equine Books
The Natural Horse: Lessons From The  Wild, J. Jackson, Northland Publishing, 1992, Star Ridge Company 
Horse Owners Guide to Natural Hoof Care, J. Jackson, Star Ridge Company 
Founder: Prevention & Cure the Natural Way, J.Jackson, Star Ridge Company 
Guide to Booting Horses for Hoof Care Professionals, J. Jackson, Star Ridge Company 
The Natural Trim: Principles & Practice (Formerly Known as: Official Trimming Guidelines of the AANHCP), J. Jackson, 2006 
Paddock Paradise, J. Jackson, Star Ridge Company, 2007 
The Natural Trim: Principles and Practice, J. Jackson, J Jackson Publishing, 2012 
Laminitis: An Equine Plague of unconscionable Proportions, James Jackson Publishing, 2016, 
Training Manual: ISNHCP Natural Trim Training Program, NHC Press, 2017, 
The Hoof Balancer: A Unique Tool for Balancing Equine Hooves (2019) NHC Press, 
The Natural Trim: Basic Guidelines, James Jackson Publishing, 2019 
The Natural Trim: Advanced Guidelines, James Jackson Publishing, 2019, 
Navicular Syndrome, Healing and Prevention Using the Principles and Practices of Natural Horse Care Based on the U.S. Great Basin Wild Horse Model James Jackson Publishing, 2021, 
Other Books
The Canvas Tipi – How to Make and Pitch Your Own Canvas Tipi, Lodgepole Press, 1982
Guard Your Teeth: Why the Dental Industry Fails Us, A Guide to Natural Dental Care, James Jackson Publishing, 2018 
Buckskin Tanner: A Guide to Natural Hide Tanning, James Jackson Publishing, 2019, 
Cheyenne Tipi Notes (1903): Technical Insights Into 19th Century Plains Indian Bison Hide Tanning, 2019, 
Living Behind the Facade: Memoirs Of a Gay Man's Journey Through the 20th Century, 2019, George Somers with Jaime Jackson, James Jackson Publishing,  
Platform: A Humanitarian Model For An Egalitarian Society, James Jackson Publishing, 2019, 
Zoo Paradise: A New Model for Humane Zoological Gardens, James Jackson Publishing, 2019,

External links

Official website
The Institute for the Study of Natural Horse Care Practices, a Natural Hoof Care Training and Education program, created by Jaime Jackson
The Association for the Advancement of Natural Horse Care Practices (AANHCP)
Paddock Paradise
Natural World Publications

Equine hoof
Living people
1947 births